Fox 12 may refer to one of the following television stations in the United States affiliated with the Fox Broadcasting Company:

Current
KEYC-DT2, a digital channel of KEYC-TV in Mankato, Minnesota
KNRR in Pembina, North Dakota
Satellite of KVRR in Fargo, North Dakota
KPTV in Portland, Oregon
KXII-DT3, a digital channel of KXII in Sherman, Texas

Former
KTRV-TV in Boise, Idaho (1986 to 2011)
KTTM in Huron, South Dakota (1992 to 2020)
Was a Satellite of KTTW in Sioux Falls, South Dakota

Other uses

Guanylurea dinitramide, an explosive compound also known as FOX-12